John Anderton may refer to:
John Anderton (footballer) (born 1933), English footballer
John Anderton (athlete) (1929–1991), South African sprinter
Jack Anderton (John Anderton), English rugby union and rugby league  player
John C. Anderton, author of Birds of South Asia: The Ripley Guide
John Anderton, the fictional lead character in the film Minority Report

See also 
John Anderson (disambiguation)